Atopogestidae is a family of millipedes belonging to the order Spirostreptida.

Genera:
 Atopogestus Kraus, 1966

References

Spirostreptida
Endemic fauna of the Democratic Republic of the Congo